Greg Veivers (born 22 September 1949) is an Australian former rugby league footballer who captained Australia in a Rugby League World Cup match in 1977. He represented Australia in seven World Cup matches from 1975 and 1977. He was a front-rower and a regular Queensland state representative from 1970 to 1978.

Background
Veivers was born in Beaudesert, Queensland, Australia.

Early life and sporting family
Veivers' father, Jack Veivers, played rugby league for Souths Brisbane and Queensland; his cousin Mick Veivers represented the Australia in the 1960s, and his cousin, Tom Veivers, played Test cricket for Australia.

Greg's brother Phil played 400 first grade rugby league games in England in the 1980s for St Helens R.F.C. and later coached Huddersfield and Bradford. Their sister Trish married Australian rugby league identity Wayne Bennett, the former national, state and multiple-premiership winning coach.

After playing rugby at school in Toowoomba, Greg Veivers was graded in rugby league by the Souths Brisbane Colts side in 1967 and made his first grade début in 1968. He played his entire first grade career with the club.

Veivers also had a spell playing in England for Huddersfield alongside fellow Queenslander and future brother-in-law Wayne Bennett.

Rugby league career
Veivers was selected as a reserve for Queensland in the first interstate match against NSW in 1970. In those days before State of Origin the many Queensland stars who headed south to Sydney club football then had to give up representative honours for their home state. Veivers remained true to Queensland and was a mainstay of the side for the next eight years representing on 16 occasions. He became Queensland captain in 1974.

He was selected for Australia for the 1975 World Series competition and he played in sides captained by Graeme Langlands, John Brass and Arthur Beetson. In 1977 a World Series was hosted by Australia and New Zealand against Great Britain and France. Veivers was honoured with selection as captain for Australia's 27-12 win against New Zealand.

Veivers played for Queensland in 1978 but didn't represent for his country again. A blood clot suffered in a midweek game in 1975 recurred in 1979 and he retired.

Subsequent career
Veivers had an insurance business in Brisbane. He was a member of the Queensland Coaching and Development panel for 10 years and a selector in the mid 90s for the Queensland Super League team.

Matches played

Footnotes

Sources
 Whiticker, Alan (2004) Captaining the Kangaroos, New Holland, Sydney
Queensland Representatives at qrl.com.au

1949 births
Living people
Australia national rugby league team captains
Australia national rugby league team players
Australian rugby league administrators
Australian rugby league coaches
Australian rugby league players
Australian expatriate sportspeople in England
Huddersfield Giants players
Rugby league players from Queensland
Rugby league props
Souths Logan Magpies players
Greg